USS Mapiro (SS-376), a Balao-class submarine, was a ship of the United States Navy named for the mapiro, 
a fish of the Gobioidea suborder occurring off the West Indies and the Atlantic coasts of Central America and Mexico.

Construction and commissioning
Mapiro was laid down by Manitowoc Shipbuilding Company at Manitowoc, Wisconsin, on 30 May 1944; launched on 9 November 1944, sponsored by Mrs. Philip H. Ross; and commissioned on 30 April 1945.

Operational history
Following trials on Lake Michigan, Mapiro entered a floating drydock at Lockport, Ill.; and was towed down the Chicago and Mississippi Rivers to New Orleans, La., to be readied for duty in the South Pacific. She sailed for the Canal Zone 31 May, arriving off Balboa 5 June for training.

Mapiro sailed for the Marianas on her first war patrol 4 August, arriving off Saipan the day Japan surrendered, 15 August. She remained on observation patrol until returning to the west coast in September, arriving at San Francisco for deactivation by 25 August.

On 16 March 1946, Mapiro decommissioned to enter the Pacific Reserve Fleet at Mare Island, Calif., 1 January 1947.

TCG Pirireis (S-343) 
In 1960, Mapiro was converted to a Fleet Snorkel submarine. On 18 March 1960 she was transferred on loan under the Military Assistance Program to Turkey. The Turkish Navy renamed her TCG Pirireis (S-343), after Piri Reis (ca. 1465–1554), an Ottoman admiral and cartographer. She left San Francisco on 16 May 1960 for Istanbul via the Panama Canal, with her new Turkish crew. Pirireis arrived in Gölcük on 23 June 1960. She was commissioned into Turkish Navy the day after.

The submarine was struck from the US Naval Register, and sold outright to Turkey, 1 August 1973; she was scrapped by the Turkish Navy in 1973.

In 1983, a second ex-U.S. Navy submarine, the former , was renamed TCG Pirireis (S-343) reusing the same hull number.

References

External links 

 

Balao-class submarines
Ships built in Manitowoc, Wisconsin
1944 ships
World War II submarines of the United States
Ships transferred from the United States Navy to the Turkish Navy
Balao-class submarines of the Turkish Navy
Piri Reis